Tommaso "The Ox" Petto ( 1879–October 21, 1905) was a New York mobster and leading hitman in the Morello crime family during the early 1900s.

Early life
Born around 1879, Petto lived in the Williamsburg section of Brooklyn. His nickname "The Ox" came from his massive head and frame. Petto's nominal profession was that of a suit presser, but his real job was working for the Morello family. The Morello family was a Sicilian clan in Manhattan that became infamous for killing their rivals, stuffing them in barrels, and leaving them on street corners.

Life as a criminal and fugitive
On April 15, 1903, after a violent fight with New York Police Department (NYPD) detectives, Petto was arrested for the murder of Benedetto Madonia, one of the Barrel Murders. The police found a pawn ticket belonging to Madonia in Petto's possession. Petto was arraigned and held at the New York City Central Jail, known as "the Tombs", pending an inquest. However, jail officials released Petto by mistake and he disappeared from New York. Petto eventually resurfaced in Pennsylvania, where he became involved in criminal activities with a Black Hand gang in the Scranton, Pennsylvania area. In August 1904, a witness implicated Petto in the kidnapping of Vito Laduca, a Morello gang member, but no charges were ever filed.

Death
On the evening of October 21, 1905, Tommaso Petto, living under the alias "Luciano Parrino," was on his way home from his butcher shop when he was shot to death in the village of Browntown, near the cities of Pittston and Wilkes-Barre, Pennsylvania. The body was described as "fairly riddled with bullets." Within a day or so, police were able to determine that "Parrino" was none other than Tommaso Petto. At the time, it was speculated that the murderer was Giuseppe de Primo, Madonia's brother-in-law. De Primo was a New York grocer who had helped the Morello gang distribute counterfeit currency. Serving a prison sentence when Madonia was murdered, De Primo was later released and allegedly tracked down Petto and killed him. However, no arrests were made and Petto's murderer was never found.

Further reading
Carey, Arthur A. and McLellan, Howard. Memoirs of a Murder Man. New York: Doubleday, Doran and Company, 1930.
Nelli, Humbert S. The Business of Crime: Italians and Syndicate Crime in the United States. Chicago: University of Chicago Press, 1981.

See also 
 List of unsolved murders

External links
GangRule.com - Tommaso Petto
GangRule.com - Giuseppe De Primo
The American Mafia: Crime Bosses of Scranton / Pittston

References

1870s births
1903 murders in the United States
1905 deaths
1905 murders in the United States
Bufalino crime family
Deaths by stabbing in Pennsylvania
Fugitives
Genovese crime family
Mafia hitmen
Male murder victims
Murdered American gangsters of Sicilian descent
People murdered in Pennsylvania
Unsolved murders in the United States